Jennifer Toomey may refer to:
Jenny Toomey (born 1968), American musician
Jen Toomey (born 1971), American track athlete